Aleksandar Gilić (born January 28, 1968) is a Serbian former professional basketball player.

Playing career 
Gilić played for the Crvena zvezda, Budućnost Podgorica and Partizan of the Yugoslav League. In the 1993–94 season, he won the Yugoslav League with Zvezda and played together with Dragoljub Vidačić, Ivica Mavrenski, Saša Obradović, Mileta Lisica, Aleksandar Trifunović, and Dejan Tomašević.

In 1999, he went abroad. During next couple of years he played in Slovenia (Pivovarna Laško), Israel (Hapoel Jerusalem),  Germany (TSK uniVersa Bamberg), Cyprus (ETHA Engomis) and Bulgaria.

Later, Gilić also played for the Radnički Belgrade of the Second League of Serbia.

Career achievements 
 Yugoslav League champion: 1 (with Crvena zvezda: 1993–94)
 Yugoslav Super Cup winner: 1 (with Crvena zvezda: 1993)

References

External links
 Player Profile at eurobasket.com
 Player Profile at fibaeurope.com

1969 births
Living people
Brose Bamberg players
Centers (basketball)
Hapoel Jerusalem B.C. players
KK Budućnost players
KK Crvena zvezda players
KK Partizan players
KK Zlatorog Laško players
KK IMT Beograd players
KK Leotar players
BKK Radnički players
Serbian men's basketball players
Serbian expatriate basketball people in Bosnia and Herzegovina
Serbian expatriate basketball people in Bulgaria
Serbian expatriate basketball people in Cyprus
Serbian expatriate basketball people in Greece
Serbian expatriate basketball people in Germany
Serbian expatriate basketball people in Montenegro
Serbian expatriate basketball people in Slovenia
Sportspeople from Sombor
Yugoslav men's basketball players